Suicide Mission is a 1954 British-Norwegian war film directed by Michael Forlong. It was also known as Shetlandsgjengen.

The film was based on historian David Howarth's book The Shetland Bus.

Plot
The true story of the Shetland bus, undercover traffic across the North Sea from German-occupied Norway to Shetland during World War II. A small group of Norwegian sailors loosely connected to the British navy take refugees from Norway to Shetland in small fishing-boats, equipped only with low calibre weapons to protect themselves from German aeroplanes and patrol boats. The film is closely based on real events, and many of the members of the group, including the leader, called "Shetlands-Larsen" play themselves. Written by Øystein Brekke.

Cast
 Leif Larsen as Self
 Palmar Bjørnøy as Self 
 Anthony Oliver as Narrator (voice)
 Johannes Kalve as Self
 William Enoksen as Self
 Odd Hansen as Self
 Finn Clausen as Self
 Gunnar Klausen as Self 
 Harald Albertson as Self
 Carsten Johnsen as Self
 Karl Johan Aarsæther as Self
 Sigvald Fivelsdal as Self
 Paul Kråknes as Self
 Øivind Steinsvåg as Self
 Johan Haldorsen as Self
 Willy Rye Andersen as Self
 Helge W. Fonneland as Self
 Michael Aldridge as En engelsk officer
 T.W. Southam as En engelsk admiral
 Per Skift as Bård Grotle
 Oscar Egede-Nissen as Peter Salen
 Atle Larsen as Johan
 Torborg Schønberg as En gammel dame
 Haakon Særsten as En hjemmefrontsmann
 Mona Levin as Carla, en jødisk flyktning

Production
The film reportedly only cost £25,000.

See also
 List of British films of 1954

References

External links
 
 

1954 films
1950s war drama films
Norwegian war drama films
Norwegian black-and-white films
British war drama films
British black-and-white films
History of Shetland
Films directed by Michael Forlong
1950s English-language films
1950s British films